Times Square Church is an interdenominational congregation located at the Mark Hellinger Theatre on 237 West 51st Street in the Theater District of Manhattan in New York City. Times Square Church was founded by Pastor David Wilkerson in 1987 and bought the Mark Hellinger Theatre in 1991.

Church history
The Times Square Church was founded by David Wilkerson in 1987. At the time, Times Square was known as a center of X-rated films, strip clubs, prostitution, and drug addiction. Wilkerson opened the church in response to what he described as "the physically destitute and spiritually dead people" he saw among the pimps, runaways and crack dealers who populated the area. The Times Square Church briefly held its services at Town Hall on 43rd Street in Manhattan and then in the Nederlander Theatre on 41st Street.

In 1989 the church leased the former Mark Hellinger Theatre. Times Square Church purchased the building from the Nederlander Organization for an undisclosed amount in 1991. At the time, the value of the building was estimated to be between $15 million–$18 million. Upon its purchase, Pastor Donald W. Wilkerson, brother of David Wilkerson and one of the church leaders, declared that the theater would not be altered, saying "The theater is landmarked and it will remain the same." The church was described as an evangelical pentecostal church headed by three pastors: David Wilkerson, his brother, Donald Wilkerson, and Robert Phillips. The theater is still the church's current location on 51st Street.

In 2001, David Wilkerson entrusted the senior pastorate to Carter Conlon, formerly an evangelical pastor from eastern Canada and associate pastor at Times Square Church from 1994-2001.  There are also visiting ministers and missionaries who come to preach from all over the world.  The church places an emphasis on prayer and even has a "prayer during preaching ministry".  There are also high school and young adults programs to teach the truth and love in the Word of God.

From 2007 to 2009 the church organized an event called Prayer in the Square, a prayer rally which took place in Times Square.

On May 5, 2020, Tim Dilena became Senior Pastor, the third since the church’s founding. He had a lifelong association with founding pastor David Wilkerson and has regularly preached at the church for many years.

Building

The Mark Hellinger Theatre was originally built by Warner Bros. in 1930 as a movie palace, the Warner Hollywood Theatre, which was later converted to a Broadway venue. Notable Broadway musicals that have played at the theater include My Fair Lady, Jesus Christ Superstar, and the Katharine Hepburn musical Coco.

References
Notes

External links

 

Evangelical megachurches in the United States
Megachurches in New York (state)
Churches in Manhattan
Theater District, Manhattan